Forrestal may refer to:

 James Forrestal (1892–1949), United States Secretary of Defense
 USS Forrestal, United States Navy aircraft carrier
1967 USS Forrestal fire, a deadly fire aboard the USS Forrestal
 Forrestal Range, a mountain range in Antarctica
 James V. Forrestal Building, headquarters of the United States Department of Energy
 The James Forrestal Campus of Princeton University in Plainsboro Township, New Jersey
 Forrestal Village, a mixed-use development near Princeton, New Jersey
 Michael Forrestal, one of the leading aides to McGeorge Bundy, the national security adviser of President John F. Kennedy
 Forrestal, a surname of Irish origin